Not All Fairy Tales Have Happy Endings: The Rise and Fall of Sierra On-Line is a memoir by Ken Williams, co-founder and former CEO of defunct American video game developer and publisher Sierra On-Line. Published in 2020, the book chronicles major events spanning from the founding of Sierra On-Line to its eventual collapse and is interspersed with discussion on management practices at the company.

References

External links
Official book website

2020 non-fiction books
Books about video games